Immeuble Clarté is an apartment building in Geneva designed by Le Corbusier and Pierre Jeanneret starting from 1928 and built in 1931–32. It has eight stories comprising 45 free plan units of diverse configurations and sizes. It is one of Le Corbusier's key early projects in which he explored the principles of modernist architecture in apartment buildings, which later led to the Unité d'Habitation design principle.

After it escaped demolition in the 1960s, the building was first renovated in the 1970s. After being again threatened with demolition in the early 1980s, in 1986 it was listed as a historic monument. In July 2016, the building and several other works by Le Corbusier were inscribed as UNESCO World Heritage Sites.

References

Further reading
Sumi, Christian: "Immeuble Clarté Genf 1932 von Le Corbusier & Pierre Jeanneret", Zürich: gta, ETH Zürich 1989,

External links
 

Apartment buildings
Buildings and structures in Geneva
Le Corbusier buildings
Residential buildings in Switzerland
Modernist architecture in Switzerland